Harlem Avenue is one of three stations on Metra's BNSF Line in Berwyn, Illinois. In Metra's zone-based fare system, Harlem Avenue is in zone B. As of 2018, Harlem Avenue is the 106th busiest of Metra's 236 non-downtown stations, with an average of 451 weekday boardings. A station building is on the south side of the three-track main.

According to the Dynamic Depot Maps website, Harlem Avenue station was originally built in 1890 by the Chicago, Burlington & Quincy Railroad.

Bus connections
Pace

References

External links 

Image of Westbound Train @ Harlem Avenue Station (Metra Railfans)
Station from Harlem Avenue entrance from Google Maps Street View

Berwyn, Illinois
Metra stations in Illinois
Former Chicago, Burlington and Quincy Railroad stations
Railway stations in Cook County, Illinois
Railway stations in the United States opened in 1890